This article lists the winners and nominees for the Black Reel Award for Outstanding Breakthrough Performance, Female. Prior to 2014 the category was no gender specific, thus was called Outstanding Breakthrough Performance. Naomie Harris was the first woman to win the Outstanding Breakthrough Performance category. Sharon Warren was the first actress to win a Black Reel Awards in a Lead or Supporting performance and the Breakthrough performance in the same year.

Currently, Lupita Nyong'o is the first person (man or woman) to win the BRA "Triple Crown" acting award with wins in the Lead, Supporting and Breakthrough categories. Nyong'o took home the award for Outstanding Supporting Actress & Outstanding Breakthrough Performance, Male for 12 Years a Slave and won the award for Outstanding Actress for Us.

At age 9, Quvenzhane Wallis became the youngest actress to win this award for Beasts of the Southern Wild and at age 38, Tiffany Haddish became the oldest winner in this category for Girls Trip. At the 15th Annual Black Reel Awards both Mya Taylor and Kitana Kiki Rodriguez became the first transgender actresses nominated in this category for their performances in Tangerine.

Winners and nominees
Winners are listed first and highlighted in bold.

2000s

2010s
{| class="wikitable" style="width:100%;"
|- style="background:#bebebe;"
! style="width:11%;"| Year
! style="width:35%;"| Actress
! style="width:49%;"| Film
! style="width:5%;"| Ref
|-
! colspan="6"| Outstanding Breakthrough Performance
|-
| rowspan="6" align="center"| 2010
|- style="background:#B0C4DE"
| Gabourey Sidibe
| Precious  (Outstanding Actress Winner)| rowspan="6" align="center"| 
|-
| Quinton Aaron
| The Blind Side (Outstanding Actor nominee)
|-
| Nicole Beharie
| American Violet (Outstanding Actress nominee)
|-
| Souléymane Sy Savané
| Goodbye Solo (Outstanding Actor nominee)
|-
| Jamal Woolard
| Notorious
|-
| rowspan="6" align="center"| 2011
|- style="background:#B0C4DE"
| Tessa Thompson| For Colored Girls
| rowspan="6" align="center"| 
|-
| Amari Cheatom
| Night Catches Us
|-
| Yaya DaCosta
| The Kids Are All Right
|-
| Omari Hardwick
| For Colored Girls
|-
| Zoë Kravitz
| It's Kind of a Funny Story
|-
| rowspan="6" align="center"| 2012
|- style="background:#B0C4DE"
| Adepero Oduye
| Pariah (Outstanding Actress nominee)
| rowspan="6" align="center"| 
|-
| John Boyega
| Attack the Block (Outstanding Actor Winner)
|-
| Gugu Mbatha-Raw
| Larry Crowne
|-
| Octavia Spencer
| The Help (Outstanding Supporting Actress Winner)
|-
| Kim Wayans
| Pariah (Outstanding Supporting Actress nominee)
|-
| rowspan="6" align="center"| 2013
|- style="background:#B0C4DE"
| Quvenzhané Wallis
| Beasts of the Southern Wild (Outstanding Actress Winner)
| rowspan="5" align="center"| 
|-
| Emayatzy Corinealdi
| Middle of Nowhere (Outstanding Actress nominee)
|-
| Dwight Henry
| Beasts of the Southern Wild (Outstanding Supporting Actor nominee)
|-
| Amandla Stenberg
| The Hunger Games|-
| Omar Sy
| The Intouchables (Outstanding Actor nominee)
|-
! colspan="6"| Outstanding Breakthrough Performance, Female
|-
| rowspan="6" align="center"| 2014
|- style="background:#B0C4DE"
| Lupita Nyong'o
| 12 Years a Slave (Outstanding Supporting Actress Winner)| rowspan="6" align="center"| 
|-
| Melonie Diaz
| Fruitvale Station (Outstanding Supporting Actress nominee)
|-
| Danai Gurira
| Mother of George (Outstanding Actress Winner)|-
| Lindiwe Matshikiza
| Mandela: Long Walk to Freedom
|-
| Tashiana Washington
| Gimme the Loot
|-
| rowspan="6" align="center"| 2015
|- style="background:#B0C4DE"
| Teyonah Parris| Dear White People (Outstanding Supporting Actress nominee)
| rowspan="6" align="center"| 
|-
| Jillian Estell
| Black or White
|-
| Patina Miller
| The Hunger Games: Mockingjay – Part 1
|-
| Amber Stevens
| 22 Jump Street
|-
| Kuoth Wiel
| The Good Lie
|-
| rowspan="6" align="center"| 2016
|- style="background:#B0C4DE"
| Kiersey Clemons| Dope| rowspan="6" align="center"| 
|-
| Chanel Iman
| Dope
|-
| Kitana Kiki Rodriguez
| Tangerine (Outstanding Actress nominee)
|-
| Assa Sylla
| Girlhood
|-
| Mya Taylor
| Tangerine (Outstanding Supporting Actress nominee)
|-
| rowspan="6" align="center"| 2017
|- style="background:#B0C4DE"
| Janelle Monae| Hidden Figures (Outstanding Supporting Actress nominee)
| rowspan="6" align="center"| 
|-
| Royalty Hightower
| The Fits (Outstanding Actress nominee)
|-
| Sasha Lane
| American Honey (Outstanding Actress nominee)
|-
| Leslie Jones
|  Ghostbusters
|-
| Aja Naomi King
|  The Birth of a Nation
|-
| rowspan="6" align="center"| 2018
|- style="background:#B0C4DE"
| Tiffany Haddish| Girls Trip (Outstanding Supporting Actress Winner)| rowspan="6" align="center"| 
|-
| Betty Gabriel
| Get Out (Outstanding Supporting Actress nominee)
|-
| Mary J. Blige
|  Mudbound (Outstanding Supporting Actress nominee)
|-
| Natalie Paul
|  Crown Heights (Outstanding Actress Winner)|-
| Jessica Williams
| The Incredible Jessica James (Outstanding Actress nominee)
|-
| rowspan="6" align="center"| 2019
|- style="background:#B0C4DE"
| Letitia Wright| Black Panther (Outstanding Supporting Actress nominee)
| rowspan="6" align="center"| 
|-
| Laura Harrier
| BlacKkKlansman
|-
| Zoe Renee
| Jinn (Outstanding Actress nominee)
|-
| KiKi Layne
|  If Beale Street Could Talk (Outstanding Actress Winner)'|-
| Cynthia Erivo
| Bad Times at the El Royale|}

2020s

Multiple nominations from the same film
 Kiersey Clemons (winner) and Chanel Iman in Dope (2016)
 Kitana Kiki Rodriguez and Mya Taylor in Tangerine (2016)
 Saniyya Sidney and Demi Singleton in King Richard'' (2022)

Age superlatives

References

Black Reel Awards